is a city located in Shimane Prefecture, Japan. The city was founded on August 1, 1952. 
As of December 2021, the city has a population of 44,976.

As of December 2019, the city has a population of 46,209.
As of March 2017, the city has a population of 46,892 and a population density of 64 persons per km². The total area is 733.16 km².

At the end of September 2010, the city had a population of 51,118. At the end of August 2009, the city had a population of 51,599. At the end of September 2008, the city had a population of 52,022.

On November 1, 2004, the towns of Mito and Hikimi (both from Mino District) were merged into Masuda. Therefore, Mino District was dissolved as a result of this merger.

Iwami Airport is located in Masuda.

Geography

Climate
Masuda has a humid subtropical climate (Köppen climate classification Cfa) with very warm summers and cool winters. Precipitation is abundant throughout the year.

Demographics
Per Japanese census data, the population of Masuda in 2020 is 45,003 people. Masuda has been conducting censuses since 1920.

Cities of friendly exchanges 
 Ningbo, China (since October 1990)
 Queenstown, New Zealand

References

External links

 Masuda City official website 
 Masuda City official website 

 
Cities in Shimane Prefecture